Folklore: Live at the Village Vanguard is an album by saxophonist Vincent Herring which was recorded at the Village Vanguard in late 1993 and released on the MusicMasters label the following year.

Reception

The AllMusic review by Brian Bartolini stated "The band is tight, and plays with soulfulness and swing. The music is enjoyable and makes for a pleasant listen, yet doesn't break any new ground. ... Folklore is a solid effort. It will please many fans of live, bop-oriented jazz and not offend any".

Track listing
All compositions by Vincent Herring except where noted
 "Folklore" – 6:22
 "Theme for Delores" – 6:09
 "The Girl Next Door" (Vincent Youmans, Otto Harbach, Schuyler Greene) – 7:58
 "Romantic Journey" (Cyrus Chestnut) – 7:58
 "Fountainhead" – 7:59
 "Window of Opportunity" (Scott Wendholt) – 8:36
 "This I Dig of You" (Hank Mobley) – 8:36
 "Mo's Theme" (Rob Bargad) – 2:25

Personnel
Vincent Herring - alto saxophone 
Scott Wendholdt – trumpet 
Cyrus Chestnut – piano
Ira Coleman – bass 
Carl Allen – drums

References

MusicMasters Records live albums
Vincent Herring albums
1994 live albums
Albums recorded at the Village Vanguard